The World Solar Challenge (WSC), since 2013 named Bridgestone World Solar Challenge, is an international event for solar powered cars driving 3000 kilometres through the Australian outback. 

With the exception of a four-year gap between the 2019 and 2023 events, owing to the cancellation of the 2021 event, the World Solar Challenge is typically held every two years. The course is over  through the Australian Outback, from Darwin, Northern Territory, to Adelaide, South Australia. The event was created to foster the development solar-powered vehicles.

The WSC attracts teams from around the world, most of which are fielded by universities or corporations, although some are fielded by high schools. It has a 32-year history spanning fifteen events, with the inaugural event taking place in 1987. Initially held once every three years, the event became biennial from the turn of the century.

Since 2001 the WSC was won seven times out of ten efforts by the Nuna team and cars of the Delft University of Technology from the Netherlands. The Tokai Challenger, built by the Tokai University of Japan, was able to win 2009 and 2011. In the most recent edition (2019), the Belgian Agoria Solar Team from KU Leuven University won.

Starting in 2007, the WSC has multiple classes. After the German team of Bochum University of Applied Sciences competed with a four-wheeled, multi-seat car, the BoCruiser (in 2009), in 2013 a radically new "Cruiser Class" was introduced, stimulating the technological development of practically usable, and ideally road-legal, multi-seater solar vehicles. Since its inception, Solar Team Eindhoven's four- and five-seat Stella solar cars from Eindhoven University of Technology (Netherlands) won the Cruiser Class in all four events so far.

Once competing cars became steadily more capable to match or exceed legal maximum speeds on the Australian highway, the challenge rules were consistently made more demanding and challenging — for instance after Honda's Dream car first won with an average speed exceeding  in 1996.

Like its two predecessors, the vehicle was successfully road registered by the Dutch team, further emphasizing the great progress in real-world compliance and practicality that has been achieved.

The WSC held its 30th anniversary event on 8–15 October 2017.

Objective 
The objective of the challenge is to promote the innovation of solar-powered cars. It is a design competition at its core, and every team/car that successfully crosses the finish line is considered successful. Teams from universities and enterprises participate. In 2015, 43 teams from 23 countries competed in the challenge.

Challenge strategy 

Efficient balancing of power resources and power consumption is the key to success during the challenge. At any moment in time, the optimal driving speed depends on the weather forecast and the remaining capacity of the batteries. The team members in the escort cars will continuously remotely retrieve data from the solar car about its condition and use these data as input for prior developed computer programs to work out the best driving strategy.

It is equally important to charge the batteries as much as possible in periods of daylight when the car is not driving. To capture as much solar energy as possible, the solar panels are generally directed such that these are perpendicular to the incident sun rays. Sometimes the whole solar array is tilted for this purpose.

Important rules 
The timed portion of the challenge stops at the outskirts of Adelaide, 2998 km from Darwin. However, for the timings recorded at that point to count, competitors must reach the official finish line in the centre of the city under solar power alone.
As the challenge utilises public roads, the cars have to adhere to the normal traffic regulations.
A minimum of 2 and maximum 4 drivers have to be registered.
Driving time is between 8:00 and 17:00 (from 8 a.m. to 5 p.m.). In order to select a suitable place for the overnight stop (alongside the highway) it is possible to extend the driving period for a maximum of 10 minutes, which extra driving time will be compensated by a starting time delay the next day.
At various points along the route there are checkpoints where every car has to pause for 30 minutes. Only limited maintenance tasks (no repairs) are allowed during these compulsory stops.
The capacity of the batteries is limited to a mass for each chemistry (such as Lithium Ion) equivalent to approximately 5 kWh maximum. At the start of the route, the batteries may be fully charged. Batteries may not be replaced during the competition, except in the situation of a breakdown. However, in that case, a penalty time will apply.
Except for the maximum outer dimensions, there are no further restrictions on the design and construction of the car.
The deceleration of the dual braking system must be at least 3.8 m/s2 (149.6 in/s2).

Rule evolution 
It was generally agreed that the challenge of building a solar vehicle capable of crossing Australia at vehicular speeds had been met and exceeded. A new challenge was set: to build a new generation of solar car, which, with little modification, could be the basis for a practical proposition for sustainable transport.
Entrants to the 2007 event chose between racing in the Adventure and Challenge classes. Challenge class cars were restricted to 6 square meters of Si solar collectors (a 25% reduction), and later to 3 square meters for GaAs, driver access and egress were required to be unaided, seating position upright, steering controlled with a steering wheel, and many new safety requirements were added. Competitors also had to adhere to the new  speed limit across the Northern Territory portion of the Stuart Highway. The 2007 event again featured a range of supplementary classes, including the Greenfleet class, which features a range of non-solar energy-efficient vehicles exhibiting their fuel efficiency.
For the 2009 challenge class several new rules were adopted, including the use of profiled tyres. Battery weight limits depend on secondary cell chemistries so that competitors have similar energy storage capabilities. Battery mass is now 20 kg for Li-ion and Li-polymer battery (was reduced from 25 and 21 kg in the past).
In 2013, a new Cruiser Class was introduced. The route took place in four stages. Final placings were based on a combination of time taken (56.6%), number of passengers carried (5.7%), battery energy from the grid between stages (18.9%), and a subjective assessment of practicality (18.9%)
In the 2015 Cruiser Class regulations, the scoring formula emphasized practicality less than before. Elapsed time will account for 70% of the score, passengers 5%, grid energy use 15%, and practicality 10%.
In 2017, solar array areas were reduced, and the Cruiser Class was changed to a Regularity Trial, with scoring based on energy efficiency and practicality.

History 
The idea for the competition originates from Danish-born adventurer Hans Tholstrup. He was the first to circumnavigate the Australian continent in a  open boat. At a later stage in his life he became involved in various competitions with fuel-saving cars and trucks. Already in the 1980s, he became aware of the necessity to explore sustainable energy as a replacement for the limited available fossil fuel. That was the precursor of the WSC.

After the 4th event, he sold the rights to the state of South Australia and leadership of the event was assumed by Chris Selwood.

The event was held every three years until 1999 when it was switched to every two years.

1987 
Ford Australia's "Sunchaser" came in second. The "Solar Resource", which came in 7th overall, was first in the Private Entry category.

1990 
The 1990 WSC was won by the "Spirit of Biel", built by Biel School of Engineering and Architecture in Switzerland followed by Honda in second place. Video coverage here.

1993 
The 1993 WSC was won by the Honda Dream, and Biel School of Engineering and Architecture took second. Video coverage here.

1996 
In the 1996 WSC, the Honda Dream and Biel School of Engineering and Architecture once again placed first and second overall, respectively.

1999 
The 1999 WSC was finally won by a "home" team, the Australian Aurora team's Aurora 101 took the prize while Queen's University was the runner-up in the most closely contested WSC so far. The SunRayce class of American teams was won by Massachusetts Institute of Technology.

2001 

The 2001 WSC was won by Nuna of the Delft University of Technology from the Netherlands, participating for the first time. Aurora took second place.

2003 

2005 

2007 

The 2007 WSC saw the Dutch Nuon Solar team score their fourth successive victory with Nuna 4 in the Challenge Class, averaging  under the new, more restrictive rules, while the Belgian Punch Powertrain Solar Team's Umicar Infinity placed second.

The Adventure Class was added this year, run under the old rules, and won by Japanese Ashiya team's Tiga.

2009 

The longtime reigning champion Nuon Solar Team's Nuna 5 finished in second place.

The Sunswift IV built by students at the University of New South Wales, Australia was the winner of the Silicon-based Solar Cell Class, while Japan's Osaka Sangyo University's OSU Model S won the Adventure class.

2011 

In the 2011 WSC Tokai University took their second title with an updated "Tokai Challenger" averaging , and finishing just an hour before Nuna 6 of the Delft University of Technology. The challenge was marred by delays caused by wildfires.

2013 

The 2013 WSC featured the introduction of the Cruiser Class, which comprised more 'practical' solar cars with 2–4 occupants. The Australian team, the University of New South Wales solar racing team Sunswift was the fastest competitor to complete the route, but was awarded third place overall after points were awarded for 'practicality' and for carrying passengers.

The Adventure Class was won by Aurora's Aurora Evolution.

2015 

The 2015 WSC was held on 15–25 October with the same classes as the 2013 challenge.

Bochum took 3rd place this year with the latest in their series of cruiser cars.

Tokai University passed the University of Michigan on the last day of the event to take home the bronze.

The Adventure Class was won by the Houston High School solar car team from Houston, Mississippi, United States.

2017 
The 2017 WSC was held on 8–15 October, featuring the same classes as 2015. The Dutch NUON team won again in the Challenger class, which concluded on 2017-10-12, and in the Cruiser Class, the winner was once again Solar Team Eindhoven, from the Netherlands as well.

2019 
The 2019 WSC was held from 13–20 October. 53 teams from 24 countries entered the competition, featuring the same three classes, Challenger (30 teams), Cruiser (23 teams) and Adventure. In the Challenger class, Agoria Solar Team won their first ever World Solar Challenge. Tokai University Solar Car Team finished in second place.

In the Cruiser class, Solar Team Eindhoven won their fourth consecutive title. Despite flipping, crashing, and ruining their car multiple times, Team Sonnenwagen Aachen and friends still managed to beat other teams.

Several teams had mishaps. Vattenfall was leading when their car Nuna caught fire. The driver was uninjured, but the vehicle was destroyed. It was the first no-finish for that team in 20 years. Others were badly affected by strong winds. 

The driver was taken to hospital. Within 30 minutes team Sonnenwagen was also blown off the road north of Coober Pedy, the driver was not hurt. An  speed limit was then imposed by event officials, lifted when conditions improved. The day before, wind damage to solar panels put the team from Western Sydney University out of the challenge. The driver of Agoria from Belgium escaped injury when their vehicle was "uprooted" at 100 km/h (62 mph) by severe winds, but still went on to win the Challenger class.

2021 
In response to the COVID-19 pandemic in Australia the WSC closed entries three months earlier than normal, on 18 December 2020. They were then to "… review all current government measures relating to social distancing, density and contact tracing, international travel restrictions and isolation requirements." On 12 February 2021, the South Australian Government confirmed the cancellation of the 2021 staging of the event. While the COVID-19 pandemic was not explicitly cited as the reason, the "complexities of international border closures" affecting Australia at the time appear to be the primary reason for the event's cancellation. The same statement also noted the next event would take place in October 2023 - at least 962 days from the date of announcement, and resulting in a four-year gap between events. Registered teams should receive a full refund of all fees.

See also 

Solar car racing
List of prototype solar-powered cars
List of solar car teams
Shell Eco-marathon
The Quiet Achiever, the world's first solar-powered racecar

Other solar vehicle challenges 
American Solar Challenge, a biennial United States event held since 1990 that has previously included Canada
Formula Sun Grand Prix, an annual U.S. event held on race tracks.
The Solar Car Challenge, an annual event for High School students from the U.S. and (to a lesser extent) other parts of the world, first held in 1995
South African Solar Challenge, a biennial South African event that was first held in 2008
Victorian Model Solar Vehicle Challenge, an annual event in Australia for schoolchildren
European Solar Challenge, a biennial 24-hour race in Belgium
Atacama Solar Race, a biennial event held in Chile

Movie 
Race the Sun, a movie loosely based on a participating team

References

External links 

Images from Alice Springs, Australia – 2007
An overview of all the competing teams in the 2013 WSC.

 
Solar car races
Engineering competitions
Auto races in Australia
Scientific organisations based in Australia
Science competitions
Photovoltaics
Recurring sporting events established in 1987
Motorsport in the Northern Territory
Motorsport in South Australia
Australian outback